Marek Baster (born 11 June 1976, in Kraków) is a Polish footballer who plays for Czarni Żagań in the Polish Second League (the regionalized third tier).

Club career
Baster began his football career with Cracovia from 1997, and, though he spent a year away, he found himself back in Kraków at the end of the 1999/2000 season.

He started playing for Stal Stalowa Wola in 2001, a third-tier team before switching back to the premier league in 2004.  He moved to Arka Gdynia in the II Liga for the 2007–08 season.

See also
Football in Poland
List of football clubs in Poland

References

1976 births
Living people
Polish footballers
MKS Cracovia (football) players
Arka Gdynia players
Footballers from Kraków
Association football defenders